Sofya Kondakova (born 1922. – 24 September 2012) was a Soviet female speed skater. She won a gold medal at the World Allround Speed Skating Championships for Women in 1956, and bronze medals in 1954 and 1955.

Notes

References

External links

1922 births
2012 deaths
Soviet female speed skaters
World Allround Speed Skating Championships medalists